The characteristic energy length scale  describes the size of the region from which energy flows to a rapidly moving crack.  If material properties change within the characteristic energy length scale, local wave speeds can dominate crack dynamics.  This can lead to supersonic fracture.

Materials science